Iden may refer to:

Places
Iden, Saxony-Anhalt, a town in Germany
Iden, East Sussex, a village and civil parish in East Sussex, England

Surname
Brandt Iden (born 1983), American politician from Michigan
Ellen Iden (1897–1961), Norwegian painter
Geoff Iden (1914–1991), British runner, competed at the 1952 Olympics
Gustav Iden (born 1996), Norwegian triathlete
Henry Iden, English Member of Parliament for Shaftesbury in 1563
Peter Iden (born 1934), German theatre critic and art critic

Other uses
 iDEN (Integrated Digital Enhanced Network) in mobile telecommunications technology
 Iden, an English automobile (1904–1907)
 Iden Versio, the main protagonist of the 2017 video game Star Wars Battlefront II

See also 

 Iden Green